The 1943 Amateur World Series was the sixth edition of the Amateur World Series (AWS), an international men's amateur baseball tournament. The tournament was sanctioned by the International Baseball Federation (which titled it the Baseball World Cup as of the 1988 tournament). The tournament took place, for the fifth consecutive time, in Cuba. It was contested by four national teams playing twelve games each from September 25 through October 19 in Havana. Cuba, who won its fourth overall, and second consecutive, AWS title.

Final standings

References
Bjarkman, P. A History of Cuban Baseball

Amateur World Series, 1943
Baseball World Cup
1943
1943 in Cuban sport
September 1943 sports events
October 1943 sports events
Baseball competitions in Havana
20th century in Havana